The Stratigraphy of the Cambrian period currently has several schemes used for ordering geologic formations from the period.  The International Commission on Stratigraphy−ICS scheme has set a stratotype section for the base of the Cambrian, dated quite accurately to   million years ago.  Russian and Chinese scientists have developed a different scheme.

Stratigraphy relates to the order of rock units, without referring to their absolute ages (which is chronology).  However, because fossils — which are traditionally the cornerstone of stratigraphy — are relatively rare in the Cambrian period, chronology has a significant part to play. If an absolute age can be obtained with a high degree of accuracy for different strata, their relative age can also be established.

The base of the Cambrian is officially defined as the first appearance of a certain trace fossil, Treptichnus pedum. However, this fossil also appears in older rocks than the locality which officially marks the start of the period.  However, there is a period of biological change which makes this time period a good one to demarcate the Cambrian from the earlier Phanerozoic eon's periods and the Precambrian supereon. Consensus holds that fossils of the Ediacara biota disappear here, as do some shelly fossils and acritarchs; and a new small shelly fossil biota emerges.

Biological changes at the base of the Cambrian

The opening of the Cambrian period is marked by a number of biological changes, including the extinction of the Ediacara biota, the preponderance of armoured organisms (e.g. the small shelly fossils), and a "widening of the behavioural repertoire" indicated primarily by an increase in vertical burrowing, first for protection and later for feeding - the Cambrian substrate revolution.

This combination of factors marks the end of the slow-moving, extinction-proof Precambrian period, and the start of a more complex food web with hugely different dynamics.  However, since there are a large number of inter-related biological factors, defining a single stratum to define the base of this period is impossible - the change did not happen over-night, but over a prolonged period.  The sequence of events leading to the Cambrian revolution in fact begun in the Ediacaran period, and culminated in the middle of the Cambrian; defining a sharp base to a gradual biological process is impossible, but it is necessary to have a globally recognised base to the period to allow scientists across the globe to know what each other are referring to and to converse meaningfully.

Biological correlations
A number of fossil groups contain short-lived species; when the species occur in disparate rocks, it can be assumed that the rocks were deposited at the same time.  Useful groups for this biostratigraphic approach include:

Small shelly fossils
There is an assemblage of small shelly fossils which was thought to be characteristic of the Cambrian.  (The shelly fossils Cloudina and Namacalathus are known from terminal-Ediacaran sediments.)  This assemblage has been thought to appear and diversify rapidly at the base of the Cambrian, but re-dating of some Russian samples has placed them long before , and shown that they are stratigraphically below beds containing 'Ediacaran' fossils.

Acritarchs

Trilobites

Trace fossils
Treptichnus pedum has been internationally recognised as marking the base of the Cambrian: it is thought to represent an onset of vertical burrowing, which was absent before the Cambrian period.  It is also widespread and easily recognised.
However, the burrows were later found below the GSSP which marks the base of the Cambrian, and their appearance is not related to any of the more significant biological events, such as the appearance of the small shelly fauna or the disappearance of the Ediacara biota. More detailed analysis of the fossils suggest that they might have been formed by extensive under-mat mining, rather than true vertical burrowing, which may go some way to explain this - they may not represent a fundamentally new biological innovation.

Other trace fossils, such as the vertically spiralling Gyrolithes, are considered to be Cambrian phenomena only. Monomorphichnus, an arthropod trace, occurs 2½ m above Treptichnus pedum in the Newfoundland reference section, and is considered in concert with T. pedum to be a good marker of the base of the Cambrian elsewhere in the world.

Radiometric correlations
Radiometric dates usually have high error margins - but in some cases precise ages are available.

Geochemical correlations
Chemical signals in rocks can be used to identify biological changes such as extinction or diversification, so they probably provide the most reliable indicator of the dawn of the Cambrian. However, they are very difficult to reliably extract in the field; and their interpretation is sometimes subjective.

Naming and divisions
Because geological time does not separate into discrete packages, the delineation of the period into stages is controversial.

One controversy is the system of defining the start of a stage.  To provide an unambiguous reference level for the start of a period, it is the practise to drive a gold spike into an internationally agreed level, thus formally establishing a single place where a period begins.  However, the location of these spikes can be ill-informed, especially in the case of the basal Cambrian.  Their limited geographical extent restricts their utility on other continents; a good stratum in each geological region is required to allow accurate cross-continental correlation.  Even biostratigraphic markers fall foul of bioprovinciality, and are of limited utility in correlating rocks on opposite sides of the globe.  Because a species may not appear in all habitats across the globe at the same time, defining the base of the Cambrian on the basis of the first appearance of one species is not desirable.

See also 

 — era the Cambrian period is under.

References

External links
Geol.umd.edu: The Cambrian Period
The Global boundary Stratotype Section and Point (GSSP) of the Drumian Stage (Cambrian) in the Drum Mountains, Utah, USA